Matt Jenkins (born in Fort Worth, Texas) is an American country music artist. Signed to Universal South Records in 2003, he released two singles in 2005, including "King of the Castle", which reached number 51 on the Hot Country Songs charts, but did not release an album. He also appeared on the Fox Networks reality show Nashville, which was canceled after two episodes. An eight-song digital EP, Quarter of a Century, was released in late 2008.

Jenkins is the brother of fellow songwriter Josh Jenkins.

Jenkins co-wrote Steve Holy's 2011 single "Until the Rain Stops", Love and Theft's 2012 single "Runnin' Out of Air", Keith Urban's 2014 single "Cop Car", Dustin Lynch's 2014 single "Where It's At", and Jordan Davis's 2021 single "Buy Dirt", which won the Country Music Association Award for Song of the Year.

Discography

Extended plays

Singles

References

American male singer-songwriters
Living people
Singer-songwriters from Texas
American country singer-songwriters
People from Fort Worth, Texas
Year of birth missing (living people)
Show Dog-Universal Music artists
People from Aledo, Texas
Country musicians from Texas